In a general meaning a Nano flake is a flake (that is, an uneven piece of material with one dimension substantially smaller than the other two) with at least one nanometric dimension (that is, between 1 and 100 nm). A flake is not necessarily perfectly flat but it is characterized by a plate-like form or structure. There are nanoflakes of all sorts of materials.

In a more restricted meaning, in the context of solar energy, Nano flakes are a type of semiconductor that has potential for solar energy creation as the product itself is only in the prototype phase. With its crystalline structure the crystals are able to absorb light and harvest 30 percent of solar energy directed at its surface.

Structure 
Nano flakes have a structure that contains tiny crystals in which millions of these crystals could fit into a single square centimeter. The tiny crystals absorb the sunlight and use the solar energy to convert it to electricity. This perfect crystalline structure is why this product can revolutionize solar energy. The large surface to volume ratio and the texture of the surface of this nano structure provides a larger absorption rate of the sun's light energy. Also researchers are working on trying to combine it with different semiconducting materials since the usual requirements of a need for a similar crystal structure for the carrier substrate is less stressed in the Nano flakes structure. The carrier substrate in the Nano flakes purpose is to permit growth of the nano structures and works as a contact for the Nano structures when they are actively absorbing the sun's energy.

Purpose 
Solar energy obtained from the Nano flakes can help benefit in a couple of ways. Nano flakes can potentially help lower the cost of solar energy. Also since more solar energy can theoretically be obtained from Nano flakes, their use can potentially keep the earth's environment cleaner by reducing the need for fossil fuels.

Cost 
The high cost of solar energy stems from the difficulty of converting the solar energy into electricity for use, and less than 1 percent of the world's electricity comes from the sun because of this process. Nano flakes can potentially help with the economic issues of solar energy by lowering the cost due to an easier process and a better outcome of energy. Nano flake technology can potentially make it easier to convert solar energy into electricity estimated at twice the amount that today's solar cells can harvest. This new technology can also potentially lower the cost of solar energy because it allows for a reduction in expensive semiconducting silicon. Energy loss is also potentially reduced with a shorter distance of the solar energy transportation across smaller Nano flakes.

Environment 
Nano flake technology can also help keep the environment cleaner as the sun as the source it produces clean pure sustainable energy that can be converted into electricity. While fossil fuel is the primary energy source for electricity, using solar energy obtained from Nano flakes will lower dependence on fossil fuels. When fossil fuels are burned for use they release a toxic gas which has a huge impact on earth's pollution. Also the process of obtaining these fossil fuels is not good for the environment, whether it be mining for coal, drilling for oil, or hydraulic fracturing of the earth's surface to reach the oil and gas.

Research 
One researcher working on Nano flake technology is Dr. Martin Aagesen at the Niels Bohr Institute at the University of Copenhagen, who holds a PhD from the Nano Science Center. Aagesen discovered and published information about the science of Nano flakes in 2007. Aagesen is Chief Executive Officer of SunFlake, launched from the Nano Science Center. Funding for Nano flake science came from Danish Venture Capital fund SEED capital and University of Copenhagen.

See also 

 Nano-Science Center (Copenhagen University)

References

Nanotechnology